"Strangers in the Night" is a song composed by Bert Kaempfert with English lyrics by Charles Singleton and Eddie Snyder. Kaempfert originally used it under the title "Beddy Bye" as part of the instrumental score for the movie A Man Could Get Killed. The song was made famous in 1966 by Frank Sinatra, although it was initially given to Melina Mercouri, who thought that a man's vocals would better suit the melody and therefore declined to sing it.

Reaching #1 on both the Billboard Hot 100 chart and the Easy Listening chart, it was the title song for Sinatra's 1966 album Strangers in the Night, which became his most commercially successful album. The song also reached No. 1 on the UK Singles Chart.

Sinatra's recording won him the Grammy Award for Best Male Pop Vocal Performance and the Grammy Award for Record of the Year, as well as a Grammy Award for Best Arrangement Accompanying a Vocalist or Instrumentalist for Ernie Freeman at the Grammy Awards of 1967.

Authorship disputes

Avo Uvezian
In an interview with The New York Times, Avo Uvezian discussed the origins of "Strangers in the Night", saying that he had composed the song for Frank Sinatra while in New York, at the request of a mutual friend who wanted to introduce the two. He wrote the melody, after which someone else added the lyrics, and the song was originally titled "Broken Guitar". Uvezian presented the song to Sinatra a week later, but Sinatra did not like the lyrics, so they were rewritten, and the song became "Strangers in the Night".

When asked why Kaempfert claimed he had composed the tune, Uvezian noted that Kaempfert was a friend of his, and in the industry, so Uvezian asked him to publish the German version in Germany in order that the two could split the profits, because Uvezian thought he would not receive royalties in the US. Uvezian said that when he gave the music to Kaempfert, the lyrics had already been revised and the song re-titled. Uvezian claimed that Kaempfert had given him a letter acknowledging Uvezian as the composer.

Ivo Robić
It is sometimes claimed that Croatian singer Ivo Robić was the composer of "Strangers in the Night", and that he sold the rights to Kaempfert after having entered it, without success, to a premier Yugoslav song contest Split Festival. In an interview on Croatian TV with Croatian composer Stjepan Mihaljinec, Robić said that he had composed a song "Ta ljetna noć" (That Summer Night) and sent it to a festival in the former Yugoslavia, where it was rejected. Then he sang a first few bars from that song, identical to the first few bars of "Strangers in the Night" ("Strangers in the night, exchanging glances..."). Robić claimed that, later, Kaempfert "composed" that very same song for him, which later became known as "Strangers in the Night". That has never been substantiated. Robić, often referred to as "Mr. Morgen" for his 1950s chart success with "Morgen", which was created in collaboration with Kaempfert, was the singer of the Croatian version of the song, titled "Stranci u noći".

Robić's recording was released in 1966 by the Yugoslav record company Jugoton, with the serial number EPY-3779. On the label of the record, Kaempfert and Marija Renota are stated as authors, with Renota being the author of the Croatian lyrics. The English title, "Strangers in the Night", was created after the composition, when New York music publishers Roosevelt Music asked lyricists Eddie Snyder and Charles Singleton to put some words to the tune. "Stranci u noći" is a literal translation of that phrase.

Philippe-Gérard
In 1967, French composer Michel Philippe-Gérard (more commonly known as Philippe-Gérard) claimed that the melody of "Strangers" was based on his composition "Magic Tango", which was published in 1953 through Chappell & Co. in New York. Royalties from the song were thus frozen until a court in Paris ruled in 1971 against plagiarism, stating that many songs were based on similar constant factors.

Recording
The track was recorded on April 11, 1966, one month before the rest of the album. Hal Blaine was the drummer and Glen Campbell played rhythm guitar. According to Blaine, he reused the iconic drum beat from "Be My Baby" by the Ronettes in a slower and softer arrangement.

One of the most memorable and recognizable features of the record is Sinatra's scat improvisation of the melody (on take two) with the syllables "doo-be-doo-be-doo" as the song fades to the end. For the CD Nothing but the Best, the song was remastered and the running time is 2:45 instead of the usual 2:35. The extra ten seconds is just a continuation of Sinatra's scat singing. The name of cartoon dog character Scooby-Doo is derived from the scat, with CBS television executive Fred Silverman having listened to the song in 1968 while on a red-eye flight to a development meeting for Scooby-Doo, Where Are You! and getting inspired by the scat.

Ironically, Sinatra despised the song, calling it at one time "a piece of shit" and "the worst fucking song that I have ever heard." He was not afraid to voice his disapproval of performing it live. In spite of his contempt for the song, it gave him a number-one hit for the first time in 11 years and remained on the charts for 15 weeks.

Personnel
According to the AFM contract sheet, the following musicians played on the track.

Bill Miller and Michel Rubini - pianos
Al Casey, Bill Pitman, Glen Campbell and Tommy Tedesco - guitars
Chuck Berghofer - bass
Hal Blaine - drums
Emil Richards and Eddie Brackett Jr. - percussion
Sid Sharp, Leonard Malarsky, William Kurasch, Ralph Schaeffer, Israel Baker, Arnold Belnick, Jerome Reisler, Robert Sushel, John DeVoogt, Bernard Kundell, Tibor Zelig, Gerald Vinci, William Weiss, James Getzoff, Harry Bluestone and Victor Arno - violins
Harry Hyams, Joseph DiFiore, Darrel Terwilliger and Alexander Neiman - violas
Joseph Saxon, Jesse Ehrlich, Emmet Sargeant and Armand Kaproff - cellos
Vincent DeRosa, Henry Sigismonti, Gale Robinson and Richard Perissi - French horns
Bill Green and Andreas Kostelas - flutes

Chart performance

Commercial performance
The single sold 60,000 copies in Brazil, 600,000 copies in France, combined it sold a million copies in United States and United Kingdom and over 2 million worldwide.

References

External links
 

Film theme songs
1966 singles
Songs with music by Bert Kaempfert
Songs written by Eddie Snyder
Songs written by Charles Singleton (songwriter)
Frank Sinatra songs
Connie Francis songs
Bette Midler songs
Andy Williams songs
Santo & Johnny songs
Connie Talbot songs
Billboard Hot 100 number-one singles
Cashbox number-one singles
UK Singles Chart number-one singles
Number-one singles in Germany
Irish Singles Chart number-one singles
Number-one singles in Italy
Best Original Song Golden Globe winning songs
Grammy Award for Record of the Year
Grammy Award for Best Male Pop Vocal Performance
Grammy Award for Best Instrumental Arrangement Accompanying Vocalist(s)
1960s jazz standards
Songs written for films
Song recordings produced by Jimmy Bowen
Reprise Records singles
Canadian-American Records singles
Songs involved in plagiarism controversies